Arthur Charles Blades (born February 3, 1942) is a retired lieutenant general in the United States Marine Corps who served as Deputy Chief of Staff for Plans, Policies and Operations and as Deputy Chief of Staff for Aviation. He is a graduate of Villanova University and Pepperdine University.

References

1942 births
Living people
United States Marine Corps generals